Human's Dust is a live performance DVD by the death metal band Decapitated from Poland. It contains the band's live performances and interviews from 2002 and 2004 from various locations. The DVD was released by Metal Mind Productions on 9 June 2008 in Europe and 10 June 2008 in the United States. The title comes from the song of the same name from the band's debut studio album, Winds of Creation.

Background 
The main feature of the DVD consists of the band's October 2002 live performance in Kraków, which was a part of their European tour with Vader and Krisiun. Bonus footage includes live performances recorded during Ozzfest in Poland in May 2002 and Metalmania festival in March 2004, the music video for "Winds of Creation", and three interviews recorded at various locations with Vitek, Vogg, Sauron and Martin. The DVD also includes a photo gallery, biography, discography, desktop images and weblinks.

The DVD was released via Metal Mind Productions on 9 June 2008 in Europe and 10 June 2008 in the United States.

Track listing 
All music written and composed by Decapitated. All lyrics written by Sauron, excepts noted.

Personnel 
 Decapitated
 Wacław "Vogg" Kiełtyka - guitars
 Witold "Vitek" Kiełtyka - drums
 Marcin "Martin" Rygiel - bass
 Wojciech "Sauron" Wąsowicz - vocals

 Additional musicians
 Jacek Hiro - guitars
 Live in Kraków Production
Jacek Dybowski - vision mixing
Jakub Zańczuk - vision mixing assistant  
Artur Wojewwoda, Waldemar Szwajda - engineering
Monika Krzanowska - recording
Robert Nowak - recording assistant 
Piotr Brzeziński - sound mixing
Jarosław Kaszyński - sound design
Lucjan Siwczyk, Bogusław Dąbrowa-Kostka - lights 
Bartosz Cichoński, Zbigniew Jaorsz, Piotr Kotarba, Andrzej Nakowski, Roman Piotrowski, Dariusz Posłuszny, Agnieszka Światłoń, Aleksander Trafas - cameras 
Tomasz Pomarański - producer
Elżbieta Nakowska - producer assistant 
Tomasz Dziubiński - executive producer
Wojciech Dziubiński, Agnieszka Doborowolska, Justyna Szarkowska - executive producer assistants
 Note
 Live in Kraków filmed and recorded in October 2002, Łeg Studio, Kraków, Poland 
 Live at Metalmania filmed and recorded in March 2004, Metalmania Festival, Spodek, Katowice, Poland 
 Live at Ozzfest filmed and recorded in May 2002, Ozzfest Festival, Spodek, Katowice, Poland

References

Notes

Decapitated (band) albums
Live video albums
2008 live albums
2008 video albums
Metal Mind Productions video albums